The Suruí Environmental Protection Area is a municipal Environmental protection area in the state of Rio de Janeiro, Brazil.

Location

The Suruí Environmental Protection Area (APA) is in the municipality of Magé, Rio de Janeiro.
It is named after the Suruí  River.
The region is one of forests, rivers and waterfalls, and is popular as an informal tourist destination.
The APA includes remnants of Atlantic Forest, well-preserved mangroves and historical monuments.
It contains the Colégio Estadual Agrícola Almirante Ernani do Amaral Peixoto, a state agricultural college.

History

The Suruí Environmental Protection Area was created by municipal decree 2.300 of 22 May 2007.
It was explicitly created by the municipal environment secretariat so as to obtain the benefits of compensation for environmental damage by the Complexo Petroquímico do Rio de Janeiro (Comperj – Petrochemical Complex of the State of Rio de Janeiro).
The APA has the purpose of reconnecting the forests between the Serra dos Órgãos and the lowland mangroves.
It is threatened by unplanned urban expansion of the Rio de Janeiro metropolitan arc.
The APA is part of the Central Rio de Janeiro Atlantic Forest Mosaic, created in 2006.

Notes

Sources

Environmental protection areas of Brazil
Protected areas of Rio de Janeiro (state)
2007 establishments in Brazil